Grangetown railway station served the township of Grangetown in the Borough of Redcar and Cleveland, North East England between 1885 and 1991 as a stop on the Tees Valley line.

History 
The station opened as Eston Grange on 22 November 1885 by the North Eastern Railway. It was situated about 1 km from the current Grangetown. The station's name was changed to Grangetown on 1 January 1902. Grangetown was one of the stations to have been adversely affected due to the closure of factories, having only a few passengers left. The station was closed to passengers on 25 November 1991.

References

External links 

Disused railway stations in North Yorkshire
Former North Eastern Railway (UK) stations
Railway stations in Great Britain opened in 1885
Railway stations in Great Britain closed in 1991
1885 establishments in England
1991 disestablishments in England